Following is a list of festivals that take place in Brisbane, Australia.

By type

General
4MBS Festival of Classics
Asia Pacific Triennial of Contemporary Art
Brisbane Festival
Brisbane International Boat Show
Parklife
Redlands Spring Festival
St Jerome's Laneway Festival
Straight Out of Brisbane
Valley Fiesta

Comedy
Bris Funny Fest
 Brisbane Street Art Festival
 Brisbane Comedy Festival

Film
Brisbane International Film Festival
Queensland Film Festival

LGBT
Brisbane Pride Festival
 Northern Exposure - an event for bears and their admirers

Theater and poetry
Queensland Poetry Festival
Brisbane Shakespeare Festival
Anywhere Theatre Festival

Food
Caxton Street Seafood and Wine Festival
Centenary Rocks! Festival
Le Festival

Cultural and folk
FAST (Festival of Australian Student Theatre)
MOSAIC Multicultural Festival
Paniyiri Greek Festival

Music
Stereosonic
Future Music Festival
Soundwave

See also

Culture of Brisbane
List of festivals in Australia

References

External links

Brisbane
Festivals
B
Lists of tourist attractions in Queensland